Jesse Huta Galung and Igor Sijsling were the defending champions, but Sijsling decided not to participate.

Huta Galung partnered with Michael Venus but was eliminated in the semifinals.

Marc Gicquel and Nicolas Mahut won the title by defeating Andre Begemann and Julian Knowle 6–3, 6–4 in the final.

Seeds

Draw

Draw

References
 Main Draw

2014 ATP Challenger Tour
Doubles